Robert Julien Mongrain (born August 31, 1959) is a Canadian former professional ice hockey centre. He played in the National Hockey League with the Buffalo Sabres and Los Angeles Kings between 1979 and 1986. The rest of his career, which lasted from 1979 to 1994, was spent in the minor leagues and then in the Swiss Nationalliga A. After his playing career Mongrain became a coach in the Quebec Major Junior Hockey League, Canadian university leagues, and in Switzerland.

In his NHL career, Mongrain appeared in 81 games. He scored thirteen goals and added fourteen assists.

Career statistics

Regular season and playoffs

External links
 

1959 births
Living people
Buffalo Sabres players
Canadian ice hockey centres
Canadian ice hockey coaches
Halifax Mooseheads coaches
HC Martigny players
HC Sierre players
Hull Olympiques coaches
Ice hockey people from Quebec
EHC Kloten players
Los Angeles Kings players
People from Abitibi-Témiscamingue
Rochester Americans players
Rouyn-Noranda Huskies coaches
Trois-Rivières Draveurs players
Undrafted National Hockey League players